Satomi Fukunaga (福永恵規, Fukunaga Satomi, born January 26, 1967, in Tokyo, Japan), is a former Japanese idol and singer. She was among the 11 original members of Onyanko Club.

Biography
When Fukunaga was a child, her parents often took her on walks in the mountains around Tokyo. Just before graduating from high school, she appeared on the Bishōjo contest for All Night Fuji High School Girl Special, which aired twice on Fuji TV in February and March 1985. However, it was not her but Sayuri Kokushō who was selected as the grand prix winner. She had already been offered a job at a computer-related company. However, the program's officials, attracted by her good personality, persuaded her to become a member of Onyanko Club. She had dreamed of becoming an actress since childhood, as her younger brother was in a theater company and she liked actress Etsuko Shihomi. As a result, she chose to join the group instead of working for the company. It also led to her being assigned to the entertainment agency .

At the time, she was said to have a facial resemblance to popular idol Kyōko Koizumi. She was selected as one of the lead vocalists for Onyanko Club's debut song, released in July 1985. Moreover, she played the sole starring role in the drama .

In September 1986, she graduated from Onyanko Club along with popular members such as Eri Nitta and Akie Yoshizawa. Kazuji Kasai, the chief director of Yūyake Nyan Nyan, described her as faint-hearted. The general public also considered Onyanko Club to be led by the strong-minded Sayuri Kokushō, who was good friends with her. In reality, however, she was the leader of the group, and Kokushō was the deputy leader along with Kazuko Utsumi.

She previously made a guest appearance in Sukeban Deka II by playing a member of Onyanko Club. Her song, was selected as the theme song for the drama. In addition, her radio program, "Heart no Ignition" was also started on Nippon Broadcasting System. In January 1987, she released . in April 1987, she released , the theme song for the cult anime show Project A-ko 2. In September 1988, Just before the Seoul Olympics commenced, she published a guidebook on South Korea titled . In November 1988, She retired from the entertainment industry, citing health reasons.

She then became an office worker and married in 1994. Entering the 2010s, she became a director of the entertainment agency .

Discography

Singles

Albums

Studio albums 
 Splash (1986)
 Sambo (1987)

Compilation albums 
  (1987)
  series
  (2002)
  (2010)

Further reading

References

External links 
 Satomi Fukunaga on Idollica
 Fukunaga Catalogue)

Onyanko Club
Japanese women pop singers
Japanese idols
1967 births
Living people
Singers from Tokyo